Persoon is a surname. Notable people with the surname include:

 Christiaan Hendrik Persoon (1761–1836), German mycologist
 Delfine Persoon (born 1985), Belgian boxer
 Sigrid Persoon (born 1983), Belgian former gymnast

See also
 Koen Persoons (born 1983), Belgian former professional footballer